Damdaming Bayan is a socio-commentary public service program of AM station DZRH in the Philippines, hosted by Deo Macalma every Mondays to Fridays at 8:00 to 10:00 am. The program is also simulcast over DZRH News Television nationwide.

History
The format of the program is the latest issues in news by sharing the opinions or reactions from the listeners and viewers.

Since 2011, Damdaming Bayan added a new commentary segment called "Punto Bonito" with Nino Padilla as segment host.

In 2012, Karen Golfo was replaced by the station's Malacañang-assigned reporter Milky Rigonan. The same year changed its schedule to weekdays.

In October 2017, following the death of Taruc, the show was anchored by Angelo Palmones. It was until January 8, 2018, when former Department of Transportation Undersecretary for Railways Dr. Cesar Chavez became the anchor of the show until June 28, 2019.

In July 2019, Deo Macalma replaced Dr. Cesar Chavez and became the new permanent anchor of the show. He was joined a year after by Elaine Apit, also known as 'Sister L.'

Awards
Best Public Affairs Program (KBP Golden Dove Awards)

See also
DZRH

References

External links
Damdaming Bayan Online

Manila Broadcasting Company
Philippine radio programs
1991 radio programme debuts